Chen Sho Fa (1928 – 5 September 2015) was a Singaporean basketball player. He competed in the men's tournament at the 1956 Summer Olympics.

References

External links
 

1928 births
2015 deaths
Singaporean men's basketball players
Olympic basketball players of Singapore
Basketball players at the 1956 Summer Olympics
Singaporean sportspeople of Chinese descent
Place of birth missing